In enzymology, an isomaltulose synthase is an enzyme that catalyzes the chemical reaction

sucrose  6-O-Alpha-D-Glucopyranosyl-D-Fructofuranose

Hence, this enzyme has one substrate, sucrose, and one product, 6-O-Alpha-D-Glucopyranosyl-D-Fructofuranose.

This enzyme belongs to the family of isomerases, specifically those intramolecular transferases transferring other groups.  The systematic name of this enzyme class is sucrose glucosylmutase. Other names in common use include isomaltulose synthetase, sucrose alpha-glucosyltransferase, and trehalulose synthase.

Structural studies

References

 
 

EC 5.4.99
Enzymes of known structure